The 2019 Canadian Mixed Doubles Curling Championship was held from March 19 to 24 at the Willie O'Ree Place in Frederiction, New Brunswick.

Teams
The teams are listed as follows:

Provincial and territorial champions

Canadian Mixed Doubles Ranking qualifiers

Round-robin standings
Final round-robin standings

Round-robin results
All draw times are listed in Atlantic Standard Time (UTC−03:00).

Draw 1
Tuesday, March 19, 7:00 pm

Draw 2
Tuesday, March 19, 9:30 pm

Note: Thomas / Aho forfeited the match.

Draw 3
Wednesday, March 20, 10:00 am

Draw 4
Wednesday, March 20, 1:00 pm

Draw 5
Wednesday, March 20, 4:00 pm

Draw 6
Wednesday, March 20, 7:00 pm

Draw 7
Thursday, March 21, 10:00 am

Draw 8
Thursday, March 21, 1:00 pm

Draw 9
Thursday, March 21, 4:00 pm

Draw 10
Thursday, March 21, 7:00 pm

Draw 11
Friday, March 22, 10:00 am

Draw 12
Friday, March 22, 1:00 pm

Draw 13
Friday, March 22, 4:00 pm

Draw 14
Friday, March 22, 7:00 pm

Playoffs

Round of 12
Saturday, March 23, 2:00 pm

Quarterfinals
Saturday, March 23, 7:00 pm

Semifinals
Sunday, March 24, 10:00 am

Final
Sunday, March 24, 3:00 pm

References

External links

Canadian Mixed Doubles Curling Championship
2019 in Canadian curling
Curling competitions in Fredericton
2019 in New Brunswick
Canadian Mixed Doubles Curling